The Mount Bold Football Club was a shortly-lived Australian rules football club that was established in 1962 as a merger between the Kangarilla Football Club and the Clarendon Football Club, initially playing in the Hills Central Football Association.

In 1964, Mount Bold transferred to the Southern Football League.  In the 1964 and 1965 seasons, Mount Bold failed to qualify for finals and disbanded at the end of the 1965 season with Kangarilla reforming.   Clarendon never re-established.

References

Australian rules football clubs in South Australia
1962 establishments in Australia
Australian rules football clubs established in 1962
1965 disestablishments in Australia
Australian rules football clubs disestablished in 1965